My Way is a 1966 studio album by the American singer Billy Eckstine. It was produced by William "Mickey" Stevenson, and was the second of three albums that Eckstine recorded for Motown Records.

Track listing
 "A Warmer World" (Ron Miller, Avery Vandenberg)
 "I Did It All for You" (Frank Wilson, Jimmy Webb)
 "My Way" (Richard Jacques, Ronald Miller)
 "And There You Were" (Ron Miller)
 "I Wish You Were Here" (Frederick "Shorty Long", William "Mickey" Stevenson)
 "The Answer Is Love"
 "A Man Needs a Woman" (Fangette Enzel)
 "Quiet Room"
 "Lost in the Stars" (Maxwell Anderson, Kurt Weill)
 "I'll Only Miss Her When I Think of Her" (Sammy Cahn, Jimmy Van Heusen)
 "Talk to Me"
 "Once in a Lifetime" (Anthony Newley, Leslie Bricusse)

Personnel 
 Billy Eckstine - vocals
 William "Mickey" Stevenson - producer

References

1966 albums
Albums produced by William "Mickey" Stevenson
Billy Eckstine albums
Motown albums